Kurd Mountain or Kurd Dagh (officially) is a highland region in northwestern Syria and southeastern Turkey. It is located in the Aleppo Governorate of Syria and Kilis Province of Turkey. The Kurd Mountain should not be confused with the neighboring Jabal al Akrad, which is located further southwest towards the mediterranean coastline.

Location and description
Kurd Mountain is a part of the Limestone Massif of northwestern Syria. The mountain is a southern continuation into the Aleppo plateau of the highlands on the western part of the Aintab plateau. The valley of River Afrin surrounds Kurd Mountain from east and south and separates it from the plain of Aʻzāz and Mount Simeon to the east, and from Mount Harim to the south. The valley of River Aswad separates Mount Kurd from Mount Amanus to the west.

In Syria, it is among the four "ethnic mountains" of western Syria, along with al-Ansariyah mountains ("Mountain of the Alawites"), Jabal Turkman ("Mountain of the Turkmens") and Jabal al-Duruz ("Mountain of the Druze").

The main town is Afrin (Efrîn in Kurdish), in Syria. The area is known for its olive growing and charcoal production. The majority of the Kurd-Dagh population are Hanafi-Muslims, while most Syrian Kurds are Shafiite-Muslims. Yazidis also have a presence in the region.

Demographics 
As the Kurd Dagh was governed by the French, several Kurdish tribes were living in the area. From the 1800s onwards, there have settled several Kurds from the Kurd Dagh to Aleppo. In the 1930s, Kurdish Alevis who fled the persecution of the Turkish Army during the Dersim Massacre, settled in Mabeta.

Etymology 
In 1977 the Kurd Dagh was renamed into the Arabic Jabal al-`Uruba in accordance with decree 15801, which banned non-Arabic place names.

The Turkish part was renamed officially as Kurt Dağı ("Wolf Mountain"), with a pun on the Turkish words Kürt (Kurd) and kurt (wolf).

See also

Yazidis in Syria
Yazidis in Turkey

References

Mountain ranges of Syria
Mountain ranges of Turkey
Landforms of Kilis Province
Aleppo Governorate
Geography of Turkish Kurdistan
Afrin District